The 2022 Fyter Fest was the fourth annual Fyter Fest professional wrestling event produced by All Elite Wrestling (AEW). The event aired as a four-part series of television special episodes, encompassing the two-week broadcasts of AEW's weekly programs, Wednesday Night Dynamite on TBS and Friday Night Rampage on TNT. The 2022 event expanded upon the previous two years, which were held as a two-part special of Dynamite.

Week 1's episodes were held on July 13, 2022, at the Enmarket Arena in Savannah, Georgia, while Week 2's episodes were held on July 20, 2022, at the Gas South Arena in Duluth, Georgia. For both weeks, Dynamite aired live, while Rampage aired on tape delay, with the first week's Rampage airing on July 15 and the second week's on July 22.

Production

Background
Fyter Fest is a professional wrestling event held annually during the summer by All Elite Wrestling (AEW) since 2019. The fourth event in the Fyter Fest chronology, it was scheduled to be held as a four-part television special. While the previous two years were only held as a two-part special of Wednesday Night Dynamite, the 2022 event was expanded to also include each week's broadcast of Friday Night Rampage. Dynamite aired on TBS with Rampage on TNT. The first week was held on July 13, 2022, at the Enmarket Arena in Savannah, Georgia, while the second week was held on July 20, 2022, at the Gas South Arena in Duluth, Georgia. For both weeks, Dynamite aired live while Rampage aired on tape delay, with the first week's Rampage airing on July 15 and the second week's on July 22.

Storylines
Fyter Fest featured professional wrestling matches that involved different wrestlers from pre-existing scripted feuds and storylines. Wrestlers portrayed heroes, villains, or less distinguishable characters in scripted events that built tension and culminated in a wrestling match or series of matches. Storylines were produced on AEW's weekly television programs, Dynamite and Rampage, the supplementary online streaming shows, Dark and Elevation, and The Young Bucks' YouTube series Being The Elite.

Results

Week 1

Week 2

See also
2022 in professional wrestling

Notes

References

External links

2022
2020s American television specials
2022 American television episodes
2022 in professional wrestling
2022 in Georgia (U.S. state)
Events in Duluth, Georgia
Events in Georgia (U.S. state)
July 2022 events in the United States
Professional wrestling in Georgia (U.S. state)